The Steel, the Mist, and the Blazing Sun is a novel by Christopher Anvil published in 1980.

Plot summary
The Steel, the Mist, and the Blazing Sun is a novel that takes place in a 21st Century world in which both America and the Soviet Union have been destroyed by a World War.

Reception
Greg Costikyan reviewed The Steel, the Mist, and the Blazing Sun in Ares Magazine #5 and commented that "The novel is readable and a suitable way to kill a few hours, but the premise is not terribly original, the writing not terribly interesting, the plot not terribly gripping... One wonders why Anvil tries."

Reviews
Review by Brian Stableford (1981) in Foundation, #21 February 1981

References

1980 American novels
Ace Books books
American science fiction novels